Against the Grain is the fourth studio album by American rapper Kurupt and his first on Death Row Records as a solo artist. Kurupt signed back onto Death Row Records, except as a solo artist in 2002. The album was delay from its planned 2004 release and was released in August 2005. It was Death Row's first freshly recorded album in over four years. The album went almost unnoticed due to the lack of promotion by Koch Records, which distributes all of Death Row's albums. It was the final original album released by the label during its original run, before being revived with BODR by Snoop Dogg 17 years later.

Production
Certain tracks were removed and others added. The cut tracks were later released on a bootleg compilation titled Against tha Grain E.P.. The track "Calico" featuring The Dayton Family was also on their album Family Feud.

Critical reception

Commercial performance
The album peaked at number 60 on the Billboard 200 in September 2005.

Reissue
The album was reissued in February 2010, under the title Down and Dirty, with a slightly altered tracklist.

Track listing

References

Death Row Records albums
2004 albums
Kurupt albums